The Goleš mine is one of the largest magnesite mines in Kosovo, located in Kosovo Polje, Pristina District. The mine has reserves of 1.74 million tonnes of ore, 46.23% magnesite and 2.66% silica, amounting to 804,400 tonnes of magnesite and 46,300 tonnes of silica.

References

External links
Official website

Magnesium mines in Kosovo